Peter Craigmyle (1 January 1894 – 21 November 1979) was a Scottish football referee.

Craigmyle was born in Oldmeldrum, Scotland, the son of Peter William Craigmyle and Isabella Barclay Craigmyle, née McWilliam.

After breaking both his legs in 1916, he took up soccer refereeing. He refereed almost every senior cup final in Britain at some point, as well as many Old Firm matches. Craigmyle is known to have officiated international matches during the period from 1924 to 1946. He refereed three Scotland-England international matches, at Hampden Park in 1941, 1943 and 1946. He retired from refereeing in 1949.

In the 1920s he had a weekly program on a local radio station 2BD. He travelled the world lecturing and refereeing, and became known as the "fearless Aberdonian." In January 1950 he was presented with a silver inkwell by the Malta Football Association, for services to Maltese football, and was made the first Honorary President of the Malta Referees' Association.

He later owned a sports shop on King Street, Aberdeen. He was also a keen bowls player, and was president of a number of bowls clubs in Aberdeen.

During World War II, he organised and produced shows at Aberdeen Garrison Theatre and ran classical music concerts in the Cowdray Hall, Aberdeen, to raise money for the troops. His book A Lifetime of Soccer was published in 1949 by Aberdeen Journals.

He died on 21 November 1979 in Aberdeen. His second wife Annie "Nan" Craigmyle died on 23 November 2004 at Aberdeen Royal Infirmary.

External links
Autobiography with photos

References

 People's Journal, 20 April 1957

1894 births
People from Formartine
1979 deaths
Scottish football referees
Sportspeople from Aberdeenshire
Scottish Football League referees